Jamali is a given name. Notable people with the name include:
Jamali Kamboh, 16th-century Indian poet
Jamali Maddix (born 1991), English stand-up comedian
Jamali Shadat (1941–2021), Malaysian comedian

See also
Jamali (surname)
Jamal, given name